The 8th Politburo of the Communist Party of Vietnam (CPV), formally the 8th Political Bureau of the Central Committee of the Communist Party of Vietnam (Vietnamese: Bộ Chính trị Ban Chấp hành trung ương Đảng Cộng sản Việt Nam Khoá VIII), was elected at the 1st Plenary Session of the 8th Central Committee in the immediate aftermath of the 8th National Congress.

Members

1st Plenary Session (1996–97)

4th Plenary Session (1997–01)

References

Bibliography
 Chân dung 19 ủy viên Bộ Chính trị khóa XII

.8th National Congress
1996 in Vietnam
2001 in Vietnam